Goldbricking (also called cyberloafing or cyberslacking) is the practice of doing less work than one is able to, while maintaining the appearance of working. The term originates from the confidence trick of applying a gold coating to a brick of worthless metal—while the worker may appear industrious on the surface, in reality they are less valuable.

A 1999 report estimated that cyberslacking cost employers in the United States $1 billion a year in computer resources. Instances of goldbricking increased markedly when broadband Internet connections became commonplace in workplaces. Before that, the slow speed of dial-up connections meant that spending work time browsing on the internet was rarely worthwhile. Many firms employ surveillance software to track employees' Internet activity in an effort to limit liability and improve productivity.

Goldbricking became a mainstream topic when Yahoo! announced in late February 2013 that it was banning remote work because it discovered its remote workers were not logging into the corporate VPN often enough.

Alternative views 
Research has indicated that permitting employees to utilize computer resources for personal use actually increases productivity. A study by the National University of Singapore entitled Impact of Cyberloafing on Psychological Engagement concluded that using the internet for personal use served the same purpose as a coffee break and helped workers concentrate and stay engaged. New research also shows that employees might use cyberloafing to cope with abusive and stressful conditions in the workplace, when they perceive that they are being treated unfairly (disrespected or given unreasonable deadlines).

See also 
 Counterproductive work behavior
 Internet addiction disorder
 Interruption science
 List of confidence tricks
 Sandbagging (disambiguation)
 Slacker
 Work aversion

References 

Employee relations